Emilia Korhonen (born 13 September 1995 in Espoo) is a Finnish professional squash player. As of July 2021, she was ranked number 154 in the world. She represents Finland in international competitions. She was Finnish champion in 2018.

References

1995 births
Living people
Finnish female squash players
Sportspeople from Espoo